Anthology: SST Years 1985–1989 is the first compilation album by the Screaming Trees, covering their tenure under SST Records. Released in 1991, about six months after their major label debut album Uncle Anesthesia, Anthology consists of three songs from the Other Worlds EP, and six each from the Even If and Especially When, Invisible Lantern, and Buzz Factory albums. Because the Screaming Trees had switched labels from SST to Epic Records, the band had nothing to do with the creation of this compilation album.

Track listing

Tracks 1 to 3 are from the Other Worlds EP, tracks 4 to 9 are from Even If and Especially When, tracks 10 to 15 are from Invisible Lantern and tracks 16 to 21 are from Buzz Factory.

Personnel
Screaming Trees
Mark Lanegan – lead vocals
Gary Lee Conner – guitar, backing vocals
Van Conner – bass, backing vocals
Mark Pickerel – drums, percussion

Additional
Steve Fisk – producer (tracks 1 to 15), organ on "The Turning", piano on "Grey Diamond Desert"
Jack Endino – producer (tracks 16 to 21), backing vocals on "Black Sun Morning"
Rod Doak – backing vocals on "Cold Rain"

References

Screaming Trees albums
1991 greatest hits albums
Grunge compilation albums
SST Records compilation albums